Chet Baker / Wolfgang Lackerschmid is an album by trumpeter Chet Baker and vibraphonist Wolfgang Lackerschmid with guitarist Larry Coryell, bassist Buster Williams and drummer Tony Williams which was recorded in 1979 and first released on the Lackerschmid's Sandra Music Productions label.

Reception 

The Allmusic review by Scott Yanow states "The mostly little-known material (five originals by the sidemen plus "Here's That Rainy Day") suits Baker fine. The emphasis is on slower tempoes (other than Buster Williams' closing blues) including a pair of jazz waltzes. Baker's chops sound fine within the limited scope that he plays. The overall results are not essential but are worthwhile.".

Track listing 
 "Mr. Biko" (Tony Williams) – 9:13
 "Balzwaltz" (Wolfgang Lackerschmid) – 6:54
 "The Latin One" (Larry Coryell) – 2:30
 "Rue Gregoire du Tour" (Coryell) – 6:39
 "Here's That Rainy Day" (Jimmy Van Heusen, Johnny Burke) – 4:19	
 "Toku Do" (Buster Williams) – 6:32

Personnel 
Chet Baker – trumpet
Wolfgang Lackerschmid – vibraphone
Larry Coryell – guitar
Buster Williams – bass
Tony Williams – drums

References 

Chet Baker albums
1980 albums
Wolfgang Lackerschmid albums